Josh Hall (born 18 May 1962) is a former British yachtsman.

Career
Hall competed in the multiple solo round the World Races

 1990 BOC Challenge
 1994 BOC Challenge
 1998 BOC Challenge
 2000-2001 Vendée Globe

During the 1994 BOC Challenge, Hall's yacht sunk during the first leg from Charleston to Cape Town and he was rescued by competitor Alan Nebauer.

References

External links
 BBC Sport, Sailing, In Depth, Gartmore

British male sailors (sport)
Living people
1962 births
British Vendee Globe sailors
2000 Vendee Globe sailors
Vendée Globe finishers
Place of birth missing (living people)